Loving Friends and Perfect Couples was a Canadian television soap opera, which aired in 1983. Originally aired on the pay TV network First Choice, the series was later rerun on Global in 1985.

The show was billed as an "adult" prime time soap opera, including unedited nudity, profanity and simulated sex, and was ultimately a parody of soap operas similar to Mary Hartman, Mary Hartman.

In the United States, the series aired on subscription television service ONTV.

The show's cast included Keir Dullea, Ross Petty, Lisa Howard, Mimi Kuzyk, Alex Amini, Lori Hallier and Cali Timmins.

References

External links

1983 Canadian television series debuts
1983 Canadian television series endings
Canadian television soap operas
Global Television Network original programming
1980s Canadian drama television series